A Portrait Gallery is a gallery or museum in which portraits are shown.

This can be a private gallery; however, the most prominent portrait galleries are National Portrait Galleries such as:

National Portrait Gallery (Australia) in Canberra
National Portrait Gallery (United States) in Washington DC
National Portrait Gallery, London, with satellite galleries in Denbighshire, Derbyshire and Somerset, England
New Zealand Portrait Gallery Te Pūkenga Whakaata in Wellington
Portrait Gallery of Canada in Ottawa, Ontario
Scottish National Portrait Gallery in Edinburgh

Portrait Gallery may also refer to:

 Portrait Gallery (album), a 1975 Harry Chapin album

See also 

 Art gallery
 Museum

 
Types of art museums and galleries